During the 2005–06 English football season, Boston United competed in Football League Two.

Season summary
Boston United managed a decent 11th-placed final finish in League Two.

Squad
Squad at end of season

Left club during season

Results

League Two

FA Cup

League Cup

Football League Trophy

Transfers

In

Out

Statistics

See also

Boston United F.C. seasons
Boston United